Student Village is a term often used by colleges and universities to describe residential areas on campus and may refer to:

Student Village (Victoria University)
John Hancock Student Village at Boston University
Turku Student Village in Finland
Cheney Student Village at Oxford Brookes University
 Manchester Student Village in Manchester, England
Hendrefoilan Student Village in Swansea, Wales
 Schlachtensee Student Village in Berlin
 Studentendorf Adlershof in Berlin